Daniel Smith House may refer to:

Daniel Smith House (Huntington, New York), listed on the National Register of Historic Places in Suffolk County, New York
Daniel Smith House (Prescott, Wisconsin), listed on the National Register of Historic Places in Pierce County, Wisconsin

See also
Smith House (disambiguation)